Paul Sterling DeJong (born August 2, 1993) is an American professional baseball shortstop for the St. Louis Cardinals of Major League Baseball (MLB). He made his MLB debut in 2017.

A native of Orlando, Florida, DeJong attended and played college baseball at Illinois State University (ISU). He was selected by the Cardinals in the fourth round of the 2015 MLB draft.  In 2017, his rookie season, he led National League (NL) shortstops in home runs with 25. He was the club's starting shortstop for the subsequent seasons until he began struggling offensively during the 2021 and 2022 seasons. He lost his starting spot and was demoted to Triple-A in early May 2022 before being recalled that July.

Early life and amateur career
DeJong was born and raised in Orlando, Florida, before moving to Antioch, Illinois, at the age of 11. He grew up an Atlanta Braves fan. DeJong graduated from Antioch Community High School in 2011. As a senior, he batted .430 with four home runs and 30 RBIs, leading his team to a 21–10 record.

He attended Illinois State University where he played college baseball for the Redbirds. He was a preferred walk on. As a freshman in 2013, he batted .260 in 100 at bats with no home runs. In 2014, he played second base, third base, and catcher, batting .349 with nine home runs and 48 runs batted in (RBIs). After the 2014 season, the Pittsburgh Pirates chose DeJong in the 38th round of the Major League Baseball (MLB) draft as a catcher. He did not sign with the Pirates and returned to Illinois State.

In 2015, DeJong batted .333 while leading the Redbirds in hits (70), runs scored (47), doubles, home runs (14), and RBIs (48).  He played shortstop, second base, third base, and catcher, and also appeared at designated hitter.  He was named All-Missouri Valley Conference first team as a utility player.  He also earned Academic All-District honors for District 5.

In 2015, DeJong graduated from ISU with a degree in biochemistry with a pre-medical emphasis. He had a 3.74 GPA and a plan to attend medical school in case a career in professional baseball would not have worked out. He also still had one year of college baseball eligibility remaining.

Baseball America ranked him as the 108th-best prospect for the 2015 MLB draft.  The St. Louis Cardinals selected him in the fourth round (131st overall).

Professional career

Minors

DeJong signed with the Cardinals for $200,000, and made his professional debut with the Johnson City Cardinals of the Rookie-level Appalachian League. After ten games, he was promoted to the Peoria Chiefs of the Class A Midwest League. In 66 games between the two teams, he batted .316/.394/.516 with nine home runs and 41 RBIs. In 2016, he played for the Springfield Cardinals of the Class AA Texas League, and was selected as a Texas League All-Star. He finished the 2016 season batting .260 with 22 home runs and 73 RBIs in 132 games. After the season, the Cardinals assigned DeJong to the Glendale Desert Dogs of the Arizona Fall League (AFL).

To begin the 2017 season, the Cardinals assigned DeJong to the Memphis Redbirds of the Class AAA Pacific Coast League (PCL).  In 46 games, he batted .294 with 11 home runs and 31 RBIs before his first major league promotion.  On defense, he made 37 appearances at shortstop, four at second base, and three at third base.  The Cardinals promoted DeJong to the major leagues on May 28, 2017, as they moved second baseman Kolten Wong to the disabled list (DL).

St. Louis Cardinals

2017

DeJong made his major league debut on May 28, 2017, playing at Coors Field against the Colorado Rockies.  Facing Greg Holland in his first at bat, DeJong hit a home run on his first swing, becoming the ninth Cardinals player to homer in his first at bat in the major leagues.  On July 8 against the New York Mets, he set both a Cardinals shortstop and a number eight hitter record with four extra base hits in one game, including three doubles and one home run.  The next day, DeJong became the first rookie in MLB history to get seven extra-base hits in a three-game series. After batting .298/.347/.638 (.985 OPS) with eight home runs and 16 RBI in the month of July, DeJong was named the National League (NL) Rookie of the Month.  He was the first Cardinals player to win the award since Wong in May 2014. DeJong became the starting shortstop in June after Aledmys Diaz was optioned to Memphis.

On August 19, DeJong hit his 20th home run, off Juan Nicasio, becoming the fourth Cardinals rookie to do so, in a 6−4 loss to the Pittsburgh Pirates.  DeJong finished his 2017 rookie campaign with a .285 batting average, 65 RBIs, and 25 home runs — the latter more than any other National League shortstop that year. Only Albert Pujols had hit more home runs as a rookie in club history, doing so in 2001. Overall, DeJong hit 38 home runs for Memphis and St. Louis. He placed second in the 2017 NL Rookie of the Year balloting behind Cody Bellinger, who won unanimously.

2018
On March 5, 2018, DeJong agreed to a six-year contract extension with St. Louis through the 2023 season worth a guaranteed total of $26 million.  The deal also includes two option years for a maximum value of $51.5 million.  It is the largest-ever agreement with a player who had not yet completed at least one full year of major league service.

DeJong returned in 2018 as the Cardinals' starting shortstop. His first multi-home run game came on April 1, 2018, as he hit two home runs to help lead the Cardinals to a 5–1 victory over the New York Mets. He was placed on the disabled list for the first time in his career on May 18 with a fractured left hand caused from being hit in that hand the previous night that required surgery. Over 41 games prior to the injury, he slashed .260/.351/.473 with eight home runs and 19 RBIs. He was activated on July 6, and returned to the lineup that night. DeJong finished his 2018 campaign batting .241 with 19 home runs and 68 RBIs in 115 games.

2019
Batting .261 with 13 home runs and 36 RBIs, DeJong was selected to represent the Cardinals at the All-Star Game in Cleveland. On July 24, while playing the Pittsburgh Pirates at PNC Park, DeJong hit three home runs, becoming the first St. Louis shortstop ever to accomplish that feat. On August 19, DeJong hit a home run that struck the 'M' letter of Big Mac Land at Busch Stadium, knocking the neon bulb out of the letter.

DeJong finished the 2019 regular season slashing .233/.318/.762 with 30 home runs and 78 RBIs over 159 games.  On defense, he had the best fielding percentage of all major league shortstops (.989).  Per Baseball-Reference.com, he led all National League fielders in defensive Wins Above Replacement (WAR) with 3.3 and assists (435), and NL shortstops in putouts (211) and double plays turned (119).  Following the season, he was nominated for his first Gold Glove Award.

2020
On August 4, 2020, it was announced that DeJong had tested positive for COVID-19, and he was placed on the injured list. He returned to the team on August 23 and finished the shortened season hitting .250/.322/.349 with three home runs and 25 RBIs in 45 games.

2021
DeJong returned as St. Louis' starting shortstop for the 2021 season. On May 14, 2021, he was placed on the 10-day injured list due to a rib fracture. He was activated on June 11. After struggling at the plate and the positive play of Edmundo Sosa, DeJong eventually moved into a reserve role. However, he shortly moved back into a starting role after Sosa sustained a wrist injury in early September. DeJong finished the 2021 season with 356 at-bats over 113 games, slashing .197/.284/.390 with 19 home runs and 45 RBIs.

2022
Once again, DeJong returned as the Cardinals' starting shortstop for the 2022 season. On May 10, 2022, DeJong was demoted to the Triple-A Memphis Redbirds after batting .130/.209/.208 with one home run over 24 games to start the season. On July 30, the Cardinals traded Sosa to the Philadelphia Phillies and DeJong was recalled from Memphis the same day and placed into the starting lineup as their shortstop. He hit a two-run home run in his first game back, against the Washington Nationals. On August 7, DeJong hit his 100th career home run, a three-run home run to help lead the Cardinals to a 12–9 win and sweep over the New York Yankees.

Personal life
DeJong has a younger brother, Matthew, and a younger sister, Emma.

After the 2017 season, DeJong participated in a scientific study as laboratory assistant with Lawrence Rocks exploring the effects of differing temperatures on the flight of the path of the baseball. DeJong and Rocks also appeared together on MLB Now at the 2017 winter meetings.  Lawrence Rocks is the father of Burton Rocks, who negotiated DeJong's first major league contract.

See also

 List of Illinois State University alumni
 List of Major League Baseball players with a home run in their first major league at bat
 List of people from Orlando, Florida

References

External links

Illinois State Redbirds bio

Living people
1993 births
National League All-Stars
Baseball players from Orlando, Florida
Major League Baseball infielders
St. Louis Cardinals players
Illinois State Redbirds baseball players
Johnson City Cardinals players
Glendale Desert Dogs players
Peoria Chiefs players
Springfield Cardinals players
Memphis Redbirds players
Wisconsin Woodchucks players